Scalarites is a genus of heteromorph ammonites included in the family Diplomoceratidae. These fast-moving nektonic carnivores lived in the Cretaceous period, from 89.3 to 70.6 million years ago). These fossils have been found in Antarctica, Brazil, Denmark, Germany, Japan, Russia, Sweden and United States.

Species 
 Scalarites cingulatum (Schluter, 1872)
 Scalarites scalaris (Yabe)

References

External links 
 Tonmo
 Asahi-net

Ammonitida genera
Turrilitoidea
Cretaceous ammonites
Ammonites of Asia
Cretaceous Asia
Cretaceous ammonites of Europe
Cretaceous Europe
Cretaceous ammonites of North America
Cretaceous United States
Ammonites of South America
Cretaceous Brazil